The Royal Moroccan Army ( Al-Quwwat al-Bariyah al-Malakiyah al-Maghribiyah,  tasrdast tagldant) is the branch of the Royal Moroccan Armed Forces responsible for land-based military operations.

The Royal Moroccan Army is about 215,000 troops strong and consists of 195,000 professional soldiers and 20,000 conscripts. In case of war or state of siege, an additional force of 150,000 Reservists and paramilitary forces, including 24,000 regulars of the Royal Moroccan Gendarmerie and 30,000 Auxiliary Forces come under the Ministry of Defense command.

Army forces from Morocco have taken part in different wars and battles during the twentieth century, from World War I, to the recent Central African Republic conflict.

History 

The Moroccan army has existed continuously since the rising of Almoravid Empire in the 11th-century. During the protectorate period (1912–1955), large numbers of Moroccans were recruited for service in the Spahi and Tirailleur regiments of the French Army of Africa (French: Armée d'Afrique). Many served during World War I. During World War II more than 300,000 Moroccan troops (including goumier auxiliaries) served with the Free French forces in North Africa, Italy, France and Austria. The two world conflicts saw Moroccan units earning the nickname of "Todesschwalben" (death swallows) by German soldiers as they showed particular toughness on the battlefield. After the end of World War II, Moroccan troops formed part of the French Far East Expeditionary Corps engaged in the First Indochina War from 1946 to 1954.

The Spanish Army also made extensive use of Moroccan troops recruited in the Spanish Protectorate, during both the Rif War of 1921–26 and the Spanish Civil War of 1936–39. Moroccan Regulares, together with the Spanish Legion, made up Spain's elite Spanish Army of Africa. A para-military gendarmerie, known as the "Mehal-la Jalifianas" and modelled on the French goumieres, was employed within the Spanish Zone.

The Royal Armed Forces were created on 14 May 1956, after French Morocco, a French Protectorate, was dissolved. Fourteen thousand Moroccan personnel from the French Army and ten thousand from the Spanish Armed Forces transferred into the newly formed armed forces.  This number was augmented by approximately 5,000 former guerrillas from the "Army of Liberation". About 2,000 French officers and NCOs remained in Morocco on short-term contracts, until crash training programmes at the military academies of Saint-Cyr, Toledo and Dar al Bayda produced sufficient numbers of Moroccan commissioned officers.

The first wars that Moroccan troops have taken part in the 20th century as an independent country were the Ifni War and Sand War.

In the early 1960s, Moroccan troops were sent to the Congo as part of the first multifunctional UN peacekeeping operation, ONUC. But the Moroccan Armed Forces were most notable in fighting a 25-year asymmetric war (Western Sahara War) against the POLISARIO, an Algerian backed rebel national liberation movement seeking the independence of Western Sahara from Morocco.

The Royal Moroccan Army fought during the Six-Day War and on the Golan front during the Yom Kippur War of 1973 (mostly in the battle for Quneitra) and intervened decisively in the 1977 conflict known as Shaba I to save Zaire's regime. After Shaba II, Morocco was part of the Inter-African Force deployed on the Zaire border, contributing about 1,500 troops. The Armed Forces also took part in the Gulf War with a Mechanized Battalion and an infantry battalion in the Omar and Tariq Task Forces.

In the 1990s, Moroccan troops went to Angola with the three UN Angola Versification Missions, UNAVEM I, UNAVEM II, and UNAVEM III. They were also in Somalia, with UNOSOM I, the U.S.-led Unified Task Force (UNITAF), sometimes known by its U.S. codename of 'Restore Hope,' and the follow-on UNOSOM II. They saw fighting during the 3–4 October 1993 confrontation in Mogadishu to rescue a U.S. anti-militia assault force. Other peace support involvement during the 1990s included United Nations Transitional Authority in Cambodia (UNTAC) in Cambodia, and the missions in the former Yugoslavia: IFOR, SFOR, and KFOR.

Recent United Nations deployment in Africa and elsewhere have included the United Nations Organization Stabilization Mission in the Democratic Republic of the Congo (MONUSCO), the UNOCI, BINUCA and MISCA (2014)

Other missions have included:
Perejil Island crisis
International Security Assistance Force Joint Command
Operation Scorched Earth
MINUSTAH
United Nations Supervision Mission in Syria (UNSMIS)

Algeria, Morocco, and other Maghreb states affected by the GSPC insurgency have been assisted in fighting Islamist militants by the United States and the United Kingdom since 2007, when Operation Enduring Freedom – Trans Sahara began.

Army of Liberation 

The Army of Liberation was a force fighting for the independence of Morocco. In 1956, units of the Army began infiltrating Ifni and other enclaves of Spanish Morocco, as well as the Spanish Sahara. Initially, they received important backing from the Moroccan government. In the Spanish Sahara, the Army rallied Sahrawi tribes along the way, and triggered a large-scale rebellion. In early 1958, the Moroccan king reorganized the Army of Liberation units fighting in the Spanish Sahara as the "Saharan Liberation Army" .

The revolt in the Spanish Sahara was put down in 1958 by a joint French and Spanish offensive. The king of Morocco then signed an agreement with the Spanish, as he asserted control over the rebellious southern border areas, and parts of the Army of Liberation was absorbed back into the Moroccan armed forces.

Nationalistic Moroccans tend to see the Army of Liberation battles in Western Sahara as a proof of Western Sahara's loyalty to the Moroccan crown, whereas sympathizers to the Polisario Front view it only as an anti-colonial war directed against Spain. Sahrawi veterans of the Army of Liberation today exist on both sides of the Western Sahara conflict, and both the Kingdom of Morocco and the Sahrawi Arab Democratic Republic celebrate it as part of their political history.

Forces today

Situation and equipment

From the beginning of 21st-century, the Moroccan army began a modernisation program that included the purchase of modern equipment and the transformation into a more professional army performing multiple exercises with allied's armies, and as a Major non-NATO ally of the US, and member of the initiative 5+5 and other cooperation agreements. The army's modernisation program took shape with the acquisitions of weapons such as the Chinese VT-1A and MRLS AR2, American M1A1 Abrams, the HAWK air defense system or the M109A5 Self-Propelled Howitzer.

The organisation and structure of command remained the same:
General Command HQ (Rabat)
Northern operational Sector.
eastern Command HQ (Errachidia)
Eastern operational sector
Tafilalt operational sector
Saghro operational sector
Southern Command (Agadir)
Oued draa operational sector.
Sakia El Hamra operational sector.
Oued eddahab operational sector.

Formations are as follows:
 2 Airborne infantry brigades.
 15 Motorised infantry brigades/Regiments.
 3 Royal Armored brigades.
 13 Royal tanks regiments.
 6 mechanised infantry brigades.
 24 Royal Artillery groups(4 Ground to air Groups/2 Rocket artillery groups/18 field artillery groups)
 1 light security brigade.
 1 mechanised intervention brigade.
 1 mountain infantry battalion.
 2 Royal cavalry regiments.
 12 Borders surveillance battalions.
 17 intervention light infantfy battalions.

International projection
The Kingdom of Morocco is part of multiple international organisations, is a Major non-NATO ally, part of the Arab League, and has established military cooperation with different countries such as USA, Russia, Portugal, Tunisia, China, Qatar, Italy, France, Spain, UAE or Turkey. As part of the UN, Moroccan Army participated in different Peacekeeping missions. Moroccan troops were sent as part of SFOR, KFOR, MINUSTAH or the more recent UNSMIS in Syria. It has also responded the call of its allies, taking part of conflicts such as Shaba I, Battle of Mogadishu (1993), the Gulf War or the Operation Scorched Earth, among others. Morocco has dispatched several field hospitals to conflict zones and areas affected by natural disasters, the latest contributions were at Libyan Civil War, the Syrian civil war. and in the Gaza strip after Operation Pillar of Defense.

The Royal Moroccan Army also performs annual training exercise called "African Lion" with the United States Marine Corps. The exercise is a regularly scheduled, combined U.S. - Moroccan military exercise designed to promote improved interoperability and mutual understanding of each nation's tactics, techniques, procedures, unit readiness and enhancing foreign relations.

Morocco has also been the venue for Exercise "Jebel Sahara" since September 2000, taken 10 times since, and gathering elements from 33 Squadron, 230 Squadron, 18 Squadron, 27 Squadron, Joint Helicopter Force HQ from RAF Benson, 1st Battalion Royal Gibraltar Regiment and 2nd Brigade d’Infanterie Parachutiste of the Royal Moroccan Army. The aim of the Exercise was to increase the Support Helicopter warfighting capability in desert 'hot and high' conditions and foster good relations between the UK and Morocco. To achieve this, the scenario consisted of a joint counter insurgency operation in the desert and mountain foothills to re-establish control and authority within a troubled region of North Africa. Another exercises were the "Jebel Tarik", with the Moroccan contribution of service personnel to an annual bilateral deployment of two companies (up to 180 personnel) of the Royal Gibraltar Regiment (RG) to the UK, on seven occasions since 2003. "Desert Vortex", a one-off bilateral helicopter exercise which is run between 16 May and 30 June 2009. This was a UK training exercise with objectives set by Joint Helicopter Command (JHC) and run concurrently with Moroccan Air Force annual helicopter crew training.

The Royal Gibraltar Regiment ran an exercise with the Moroccan 2e Brigade d'Infanterie Parachutiste (2e BIP) in late 2008.

The Royal Armed Forces also take part of different international exercises as Leapfest, Flintlock, Blue Sand, and occasional military operations exercises with Belgium, U.A.E., Spain, France and others.

Ranks and structure

Officers 

 Général de l'armé et commandant en chef: Retained by His Majesty the King of Morocco.

Enlisted

In 2009, the Moroccan army had:

Equipment

Uniform
The most common service uniform of the Royal Moroccan Army is olive drab, but you can also see Moroccan troops with other types of uniforms such as the Desert lizard, Red Lizard and Camouflage Central-Europe uniforms.The uniform has been changed into a newer and modern one :

See also
Royal Moroccan Armed Forces
Royal Moroccan Navy
Royal Moroccan Air Force
Moroccan Royal Guard
Royal Moroccan Gendarmerie
Auxiliary Forces

References

Further reading 
 Anthony Cordesman, 'A Tragedy of Arms'
John Keegan "World Armies" 
R. Hure "L'Armee d' Afrique 1830-1962"

Military of Morocco
Military units and formations established in 1956